Stanton Frederick Kalk (14 October 1894 – 6 December 1917) was an officer in the United States Navy during World War I.  He received the Navy's Distinguished Service Medal for his actions after his ship was torpedoed by a German submarine.

Biography
Stanton Kalk was born in Mobile County, Alabama, the son of Frank Kalk and Flora Stanton Kalk. He was appointed to the Naval Academy by Nebraska Senator Norris Brown, and graduated in 1916, fifty-first in a class of 178.

After serving on the battleship , he was assigned to the destroyer  on 10 September 1917. While steaming on patrol duty from Brest, France, to Queenstown, Ireland, Jacob Jones was attacked on 6 December by German submarine U-53. Although Kalk, officer-of-the-deck during the attack, "took correct and especially prompt measures in maneuvering to avoid the torpedo," the destroyer could not turn in time to escape. She sank stern first in eight minutes. Though stunned by the explosion and weakened by his action after the ship went down, Kalk swam from one raft to another in an attempt to equalize weight on them. Displaying "extraordinary heroism," he disregarded his own condition while endeavoring to save the lives of his men. Game to the last, Kalk overtaxed his own strength; he died from exposure and exhaustion.

For his "splendid self-sacrifice" Lt. (j.g.) Kalk was posthumously awarded the Distinguished Service Medal.

Namesakes

References

1894 births
1917 deaths
People from Mobile County, Alabama
United States Naval Academy alumni
United States Navy officers
United States Navy personnel of World War I
Recipients of the Navy Distinguished Service Medal
American military personnel killed in World War I